.ZADNA (.za Domain Name Authority) is a not-for-profit company that administrates the .za namespace. The .za Domain Name Authority (.ZADNA is statutory regulator and manager of .ZA. .za is the Internet country code top-level domain (ccTLD) for South Africa. .ZADNA is an agency of South African government under the Department of Communications and Digital Technologies.  ZADNA is the administrator of registry of the South Africa ccTLD.

.ZA domain information 
.ZADNA is responsible for deciding .ZA second level domain (SLD) structure

Moderated second-level domains 
 AC.za
 EDU.za
 GOV.za
 NOM.za

Unmoderated second-Level domains 
 CO.za
 NET.za

.ZA domain name dispute resolution 
.za Alternative Dispute Resolution (ADR) regulations to resolve .za domain name registration disputes.

.ZA domain name disputes types:
 Abusive registration
 Offensive registration
Alternative Dispute Resolution (ADR) only applicable to un-moderated Second Level Domains (SLDs)

References

External links

Domain name registries
Information technology organisations based in South Africa
Government departments of South Africa
Internet in South Africa
Internet governance
Internet-related organizations